The National Park to Park Highway was an auto trail in the United States in the 1910s and 1920s, plotted by A. L. Westgard. It followed a large loop through the West, connecting twelve National Parks:
Rocky Mountain National Park
Yellowstone National Park
Glacier National Park
Mount Rainier National Park
Crater Lake National Park
Lassen Volcanic National Park
Yosemite National Park
General Grant National Park (now part of Kings Canyon)
Sequoia National Park
Zion National Park
Grand Canyon National Park
Mesa Verde National Park

History
In 1914, Secretary of the Interior Lane entered into an agreement with the Office of Public Roads to develop road access to Glacier, Sequoia and Yosemite National Parks. When Stephen T. Mather became involved with the National Parks, he invited the Office of Public Roads Engineer T. Warren Allen to speak at the 1915 Berkeley National Parks Conference.  Mather had concerns over letting the Office of Public Roads develop highway systems within the National Parks.  While Allen's approach to public roads saw no difference between National Forests and National Parks, his involvement was an early indication of the public interest in driving.

It was the following year that Mather joined the campaign for the Park to Park Highway. The National Park-to-Park Highway Association was formed in 1916 and began promoting roads and roadway improvements in the Northwest and Rocky Mountain states. Other Highway Associations had been supporting a variety of routes linking the scenic wonders of the western National Parks. In 1915, a Denver group of motorists took off on a  journey from Rocky Mountain National Park to Yellowstone. The Wonderland Trail Association was already promoting the next segment of the journey from Yellowstone to Glacier and then westward to Mount Rainier.

In 1917, the Parks Highway Association began marking the route from Glacier to Mount Rainier and added a southern segment to Crater Lake. By 1919, there were annual meetings of the National Park to Park supporters. That same year, Charles Goodwin was assigned as Superintendent at Glacier. Here, he began to work on developing potential routes through the park. When Mather's preference for an east-west link across the park was made known, he began looking for a route to link the two sides that would complement the Park-to-Park Highway. This route would become the Going-to-the-Sun Road.

By 1920, eleven states were involved in the Park-to-Park Highway program. The proposed route would cover  of roads and numerous feeders to and from the various National Parks.

Notes

External links
 Map of the National Park-to-Park Highway from 1924
 National Parks Traveler: The National Park to Park Highway
 2009 PBS documentary

 

Auto trails in the United States
National parks of the United States
1916 establishments in the United States